Cologno Sud is a suburban station on Line 2 of the Milan Metro in the municipality of Cologno Monzese.

History
The station was opened on 7 June 1981 with the opening of the Cologno Monzese branch from Cascina Gobba to Cologno Nord.

References

Line 2 (Milan Metro) stations
Railway stations opened in 1981
1981 establishments in Italy
Railway stations in Italy opened in the 20th century